Lac de Gaschet ('Gaschet Lake') or Barrage de Gaschet ('Gaschet Dam') is an artificial reservoir that forms the largest freshwater lake in Guadeloupe.

Located within the Port-Louis municipality, on the northern side of the Grande-Terre island, and adjacent to Petit-Canal municipality, the lake is known for its rich diversity of bird-life.

History
The Lake was constructed in the early 1990s as part of an irrigation project to support local agriculture.

Geography
The Lake is approximately 4 km from the coast. It has several 'branches', of which one is crossed by the local road, D128. The dam which holds the water back, situated at the south-western end of the lake, is approximately 100 m long.

Birdlife

The Lake is home to many water birds.   Particularly numerous are masked ducks, pied-billed grebes and common moorhens. In 2000 the site was formally recognised as a natural zone of ecological interest, fauna and flora (ZNIEFF) and protected by fences, though some illegal shooting occurs. A 290 ha area, encompassing the lake and its immediate surrounds, has been recognised as an Important Bird Area (IBA) by BirdLife International.

References

Lakes of Guadeloupe
Important Bird Areas of Guadeloupe